Pierre Charles Baquoy (27 July 1759 – 4 February 1829) was a French painter and engraver, known for depictions of famous historical characters.

Baquoy was born and died in Paris.  In his time he was considered an eminent artist-engraver and among other things was a professor of drawing and an employee of the Musee Royal.

He was the illustrator of the Kehl edition of Voltaire and also produced some of the engravings for the 1788-1793 Complete Works of Rousseau (Émile and Theátre et Poesies) 

He was also one of the painters depicting contemporary society in Paris for early fashion magazines such as the Journal des Dames et des Modes and "La Mesangere" (published between 1797 and 1839).

His drawings of this kind, like those of others such as the La Mesangere editor Pierre Antoine Leboux de la Mesangere, Paul Gavarni, Antoine Charles Horace Vernet and Louis-Marie Lanté are considered an essential resource for the study of the fashion and society of the time.

References

External links

 Caesarea (Straton’s Tower), view of Caius Caesar's Cenotaph. In the front, tents of a caravan. Between the foothills and the mountains in the back, galloping horsemen. 1799.
 Frederic et Voltaire, circa 1796 - 1798
 Pierre Charles Baquoy, Napoleon at St. Helen
 Les petits parrains (The little godfathers)
 1787 Illustration for Chapter 19 of Voltaire's Candide in "Os anos que salvaram a reputação de Voltaire" (Portuguese-language article)
 Microfilm collection of 

18th-century French painters
French male painters
19th-century French painters
1759 births
1829 deaths
19th-century French male artists
18th-century French male artists